Aktan is a given name and a surname. Notable people with the name include:

Aktan Abdykalykov (born 1957), Kyrgyzstani screenwriter
A. Emin Aktan, American engineer
Coşkun Can Aktan (born 1963), Turkish economist
Hamza Aktan (born 1983), Kurdish journalist and writer